Gunbela is a village on the  in the Adamawa Region of Cameroon.

Geography 
The climate is temperate and the vegetation is savannah.

Infrastructure 
There is a CES for secondary education at Gunbela, as well as a public primary school for all levels (SIL-CP, CE1-CE2, CM1-CM2) and a kindergarten with several grades. The village also has a health centre.

Demographics 
The people of the village are Gbaya and Fula people; they are a mixture of Catholic and Muslim.

In cultural matters Gunbela is led by a traditional chief. The most common traditional dish in the village is the "kamgeda", which consists of roast beef and manioc couscous.

Economy and transport 
The economy is based on agriculture and the sale of agricultural products, like sweet potatoes, arrowleaf elephant's ear, various legumes, melons, and fruits. There is a periodic market at which these goods are sold.

Transport is by motorcycle and public transport cars.

Notable people
Aboubakar Kombo, mayor of the commune of Meiganga resides in the village.

Djouldé Adjia is the current chief

References 

Populated places in Adamawa Region